Isabelle Hayeur (born 1969) is a Canadian visual artist known for her photographs and experimental film. Hayeur’s works are inspired by a critical analysis of ecology and urbanity. Since the late 1990s, Hayeur has created public art commissions, photography books, video installations, and has participated in many solo and group exhibitions. Her artworks can be found in both national and international collections, including those of the National Gallery of Canada, the Vancouver Art Gallery, the Art Gallery of Ontario, the Art Gallery of Alberta (Edmonton), the Musée d’art contemporain de Montréal, the New Orleans Museum of Art and the Museum of Contemporary Photography in Chicago, and the Fonds national d’art contemporain in Paris.

Early life and education 
Isabelle Hayeur was born in Montreal, Canada, in 1969. Hayeur obtained a Bachelor of Fine Arts degree in 1997 and a Master of Fine Arts degree in 2002, both from the Université du Québec à Montréal. She has lived and worked in Montreal for most of her life. Hayeur was raised in the suburb of Bois-des-Filion in Montreal, where she lived into her early 20s. During these years, Hayeur experienced feelings of alienation and dislocation that she believes to accompany suburban living. Hayeur’s suburban upbringing is highly influential to her works, where she frequently confronts the issue of land exploitation in urban planning. Hayeur currently resides in the Rawdon Municipality, located on the Ouareau River in southwestern Quebec, Canada.

Artistic practice

Digital imaging 
Hayeur primarily works in digital imaging. She is known for her large scale environment-based photomontages. Hayeur uses photo manipulation to create new artificial landscapes. In Her 2004–2007 photo series Model Homes, Hayeur creates images with photographs of houses from both quaint suburban dwellings and prefabricated model homes. As opposed to the modest, more dated, homes, the model homes all look similar due to "cookie cutter" architectural elements. Steepled roofs, bay windows, and double car garages, stand out as formal characteristics of urban sprawl building. The fanciful character of these model homes are exemplary of society's use of repetition and familiarity in construction as a means of creating a new, urban, identity. Using photo manipulation, Hayeur places these homes in different environments to give them new contexts. These new contexts are described as being both no place and everyplace, referencing how seemingly rural Canadian communities have become prime venues for suburban sprawl.

In her 2005–2007 photo exhibition Excavations, Hayeur places ground-level views of generic suburban homes in construction sites. By photographing construction sites at ground-level, Hayeur records the erasure of the land by capturing the rich topsoil being removed to create barren grounds ready for development. The goal of Excavations is to show model homes in unaltered environments, providing x-ray like visions of the geological foundations they sit upon. By using digital manipulation to merge these man made habitats with their natural origins, Hayeur shows the coexistence of spaces that appear disconnected.

Hayeur utilizes underwater cameras in her digital imaging practice. In her 2008–2013 photo series Underworlds, she captures photographs of aquatic ecosystems. The images are taken either fully underwater or, partially underwater, as to show the aquatic ecosystem's relationship to the environment above. In this project, Hayeur photographs the waterways near New Jersey's chemical coast and in Rossville (Staten Island). The photographs reveal "aquatic deserts," which Hayeur attributes to a lack of oxygen caused by pollution in these areas. In her photographs, Hayeur captures the unconventional beauty of these lifeless waters as they become animated in the wavering sunlight.

Hayeur also works in panoramic photography to capture expansive landscapes. Hayeur’s panoramic photographs are digitally manipulated as she retouches the landscapes by adding fragments of other images taken from environments in various locations. With these additions, Hayeur’s images reveal conditions of the environment that unaltered documentary photography cannot show.

Hayeur’s photo manipulations are described as a parody of objective documentary photography.  To create these images, Hayeur uses Adobe Photoshop software.

Video 
Hayeur is also known for her works in experimental film. Losing Ground is a critique of urban sprawl, drawing attention to the erosion and homogenization of the countryside that results from it. In Losing Ground, Hayeur uses time lapse videography to capture recently man-made territories, confronting viewers with footage of their own depleting environment.

Site-Specific Installations 
Hayeur integrates her environmental-critique works into the environment itself by creating site-specific installations in high traffic public areas.

In her 2010 site-specific video installation Fire with Fire, Hayeur simulates a fire in a four-storey heritage building located in Vancouver's Downtown Eastside. Using three Blu-ray disk players and multiple video projectors, Hayeur loops a 15 minute video of a fire onto the windows of the building. This installation being in Vancouver's oldest and most run-down neighbourhood is purposeful. The work comments on the neglect of the area as its residence struggle with homelessness, drug abuse, prostitution, and violence.

Sommeil  (ou Les séjours sous terre) is a photographic work in the international quarter of Montreal. It was integrated into the pedestrian path where it remained from 2005 to 2006.

Songes a photo triptych. It was installed at the cultural community centre of Montréal-Nord in 2005 where it remained for one year.

Other 
Beyond digital imagery and video, Hayeur has been known to work in Internet art. Currently, none of these works exist publicly online.

Themes

Urban sprawl 
One of the main themes in Hayeur’s work is urban sprawl. Urban sprawl refers to the environmental consequences of the uncontrolled building of homes and commercial buildings over large territories. Hayeur highlights the irony between persistent urbanization and the accompanying disappearance of things. Particularly interested in the flaws of housing in modern society, Hayeur examines how the rapid erection of disposable homes causes the environmental needs of various lands to be neglected.

Industrialization 
Much of Hayeur’s work critiques industrialization. Hayeur expresses worries about the ways humans have inhabited natural territories. She often refers to work in construction, road building, drilling, and archaeology, in her artworks. She critiques these industrialized spaces by blending different sites into a single territory. This draws attention to the dehumanized state of these spaces. Hayeur’s documentary style photography (normally associated with realism) to create these fictive images further emphasizes industrialization’s dehumanization.

Ecotopia 
Ecotopia is derived from the subgenre Ecotopian fiction. Ecotopian fiction is derived from the synthesis of utopian and dystopian worlds. In 2012, Hayeur participated in a group exhibition called Ecotopia. Here, Hayeur and her contemporaries presented works that show the coexistence of rural and urban, natural and manufactured, protection and exploitation, conservation and destruction, nostalgia and futuristic vision, to challenge the notion that modernity equals progress. Hayeur’s contribution was footage from her 2012 video, Losing Ground. Hayeur’s video evokes themes of Ecotopia as it shows a blend of industrial architecture amongst environmental decay and erosion.

Capitalism 
Hayeur criticizes capitalism in her photographs and exhibitions. She denounces society’s consumerist mindset with the extreme accumulation of goods and money as well as the giant infrastructure projects that destroy the environment.

Collaborations 
In 2004, Hayeur was a part of a 10 month field study conducted by Jude Leclerc and Frederic Gosselin, researchers in the Department of Psychology at the University of Montreal. Leclerc and Gosselin examined the under-researched cognitive problem solving process in a contemporary visual arts practice. Hayeur was the test subject and data on her creative processes was collected through multiple 30-60 minute interviews and site visits to her workspace. The study revealed that within the creative realm, the cognition of a professional artist is on part with the cognition of a scientist.

Hayeur collaborated with a plethora of artists and curators throughout her career. At the VOX Gallery’s show Awakening in 2004, Hayeur collaborated with the artists Mark Lewis and Mary Kunuk. These three Canadian artists manipulated the idea of landscape through their works in this exhibition via still photography, video, and cinema.

Solo exhibitions 

 Musée d'art de Joliette (Canada)
Musée d'art contemporain de Montréal (Canada)
Musée national des beaux-arts du Québec (Canada)
Massachusetts Museum of Contemporary Art (United States)
 The Museum of Contemporary Photography in Chicago (MoCP) (United States)
 The Casino Luxembourg forum d'art contemporain (Luxembourg)
 The Neuer Berliner Kuntsverein (Berlin, Germany)
 The Southern Alberta Art Gallery (Lethbridge, Canada)
 The Oakville Galleries (Ontario, Canada)
 The Agnes Etherington Art Center (Kingston, Canada)
 The Prefix Institute of Contemporary Art (Toronto, Canada)
 Tampa Museum of Art (Tampa, Florida)
 Les rencontres de la photographie à Arles 2006 (France)
Photographies récentes, Galerie Sans-Nom, 1996 (Moncton, Canada)
Les instants détournés, Action Art Actuel, 1997 (Saint-Jean sur le Richelieu, Canada)
Les instants détournés, Galerie L’oeuvre de l’autre, 1998 (Chicoutimi, Canada)
Les instants détournés, Praxis art actuel, 1998 (Saint-Thérèse, Canada)  Dérives, Séquence, 1999 (Chicoutimi, Canada)
Beyond Gardens, Pari Nadimi Gallery, 2000 (Toronto, Canada)
Paysages incertains, L’Écart, Rouyn-Noranda, 2000 (Canada)
Paysages incertains, Galerie Verticale, 2001 (Laval, Canada)
Drift, Eye Level Gallery, 2001 (Halifax, Canada)
Chantiers, Centre des arts Visuels Skol, 2001 (Montreal, Canada)
Quelque part, L’Espace F, Matane, 2002 (Canada)
Spill No. 3: Paysages incertains, Artspeak, 2004 (Vancouver, Canada)
Destinations, Pari Nadmi Gallery, 2004 (Toronto, Canada)
Milutin Gubash & Isabelle Hayeur, Paved Arts, 2004 (Saskatoon, Canada)
Somewhere, Platform Centre for Photographic & Digital Arts, 2004 (Winnipeg, Canada)
Quarternaire, Galérie Thérèse Dion, 2007 (Canada)

Awards 

 Prix OFQJ, Champ Libre, Le Fresnoy (2004) 
 Prix Contact For emerging photography artist  (2001)

References 

1969 births
Living people
Canadian women photographers
Université du Québec à Montréal alumni